The Sea Quest was a semi-submersible drilling rig.  She discovered the UK's first North Sea oil on 14 September 1969 in the Arbroath Field.  She also discovered the first giant oil field named Forties on 7 October 1970.

The Sea Quest was built by Belfast shipbuilders Harland and Wolff for BP at a cost of £3.5 million and launched on 8 January 1966.

In 1977, Sea Quest was sold to Sedco (now part of Transocean) and renamed Sedco 135C.  She was towed to the west coast of Africa. On 17 January 1980, while drilling in the Warri area, Nigeria, a blowout occurred and the rig sustained extensive fire damage. The rig was then deliberately sunk in deep water.

References

Collapsed oil platforms
Semi-submersibles
Drilling rigs
Ships of BP
Transocean
Ships built by Harland and Wolff
Ships built in Belfast